The Only One is an album by pianist Kenny Barron which was recorded in 1990 and released on the Reservoir label.

Reception 

In his review on AllMusic, Ron Wynn stated: "Standards galore, each played with care, artistry, and brilliance".

Track listing 
 "The Only One" (Kenny Barron) - 7:09
 "The Surrey with the Fringe on Top" (Richard Rodgers, Oscar Hammerstein II) - 6:53    
 "The Courtship" (Benny Carter) - 6:05
 "Blueswatch" (Christina Blalock) - 5:08
 "On the Sunny Side of the Street" (Jimmy McHugh, Dorothy Fields) - 5:19    
 "Warm Valley" (Duke Ellington) - 6:24
 "Manila" (Blalock) - 5:05    
 "Tone for Joan's Bones" (Chick Corea) - 5:13
 "Love for Sale" (Cole Porter) - 7:12
 "Delores Street, S.F." (Barron) - 5:51
 "All God's Chillun Got Rhythm" (Walter Jurmann, Gus Kahn, Bronisław Kaper) - 5:09

Personnel 
Kenny Barron – piano
Ray Drummond – bass (tracks 1-5 & 7-11)
Ben Riley – drums (tracks 1-5 & 7-11)

References 

Kenny Barron albums
1990 albums
Reservoir Records albums
Albums recorded at Van Gelder Studio